Wayne Wilson Hicks (born April 9, 1937) is an American-born Canadian former professional ice hockey right winger who played in the National Hockey League (NHL) with the Chicago Black Hawks, Boston Bruins, Montreal Canadiens, Pittsburgh Penguins and Philadelphia Flyers. 

Hicks was born in Aberdeen, Washington and raised in Kelowna, British Columbia.

Hicks played one game for Chicago in the 1961 Stanley Cup Finals, helping them win the Stanley Cup.

Hicks has the distinction of being the first American-born player to play on the Philadelphia Flyers and was part of the team's starting lineup for the opening shift against the California Golden Seals in the franchise's inaugural regular-season game on October 11, 1967.

Hicks scored the first goal at the renovated Madison Square Garden on February 18, 1968.

Hicks is the father of Alex Hicks, who also played for the Pittsburgh Penguins. When Alex had his first game for the Penguins, it marked the first time a father and son played for the Penguins franchise.

Awards
 Stanley Cup champion, Chicago Black Hawks (1961)
 Inducted to Regional District of Central Okanagan Sports Hall of Fame, 2015

Career statistics

Regular season and playoffs

References

External links
 

1937 births
Living people
American men's ice hockey right wingers
Canadian expatriate ice hockey players in the United States
Canadian ice hockey right wingers
Baltimore Clippers players
Boston Bruins players
Buffalo Bisons (AHL) players
Chicago Blackhawks players
Ice hockey people from British Columbia
Ice hockey people from Washington (state)
Montreal Canadiens players
People from Aberdeen, Washington
Philadelphia Flyers players
Phoenix Roadrunners (WHL) players
Pittsburgh Penguins players
Quebec Aces (AHL) players
Salt Lake Golden Eagles (WHL) players
Sault Thunderbirds players
Sportspeople from Kelowna
Stanley Cup champions